Night Club is a 1952 Australian film musical directed by A. R. Harwood. It is a remake of Harwood's 1938 film, Show Business.

Plot
Singer Nina Fleming persuades playboy Bill Winters to get his wealthy woolgrower father James to back a show starring her. Bill goes to a country town to work on the script . He meets some local variety acts and persuades James to present them in a city night club act. The show is a success despite the efforts of Nina to stop them.

Cast
 Joey Porter as Nick Adams
 Joff Ellen as Joss
 Joan Bilceaux as Nita Fleming
 Colin Crane as James Winter
 Frank Holbrook as Bill Winters
 Marjorie Harwood as Joan McDonald
 Alex Roy as Jack Hanson
 Ray Jones as compere
 Reg Glenny as detective
 Johnny Goodwin as cleaner
 Barney March
 LLoyd Nairn
 the Carence Sisters
 Tricia Dorran
 the Leonard Boys
 the Spencer Trio
 the Geoff Kitchen Quintette

Production
This was Harwood's first feature in a number of years. The production budget was provided entirely by Melbourne documentary firm Cambridge Films.

The cast were mostly taken from vaudeville, stage and radio, with a number of vaudeville acts appearing. Joan Bilceaux was a blues singer and runner up to Miss Victoria; Joff Ellen was a comedian; Colin Crane had appeared in Show Boat. Harwood cast his daughter as the ingenue and himself as a detective (under the name of "Alex Roy"). Said Harwood at the time:
Comedy is the keynote of the show. That's what the film public is demanding these days. Revivals of old Pat Hanna and George Wallace slapstick comedies are proving an outstanding success.The response demonstrates that the public wants a hearty laugh . . and so that's the type of Australian film I'm concentrating on.

Shooting began on 5 July 1952, partly at the Park Orchards cabaret, near Ringwood. The club was visited by licensing police during filming. Sound was recorded "wild" on a simple wire recorder, making it impossible to synchronise in post production.

Release
Harwood claimed he was so pleased with the comedy team of Joey Porter and Joff Ellen he wanted to put them in another movie together, about Brisbane's show business train. However, Night Club only achieved a limited release and was a failure at the box office, proving to be Harwood's last movie.

References

External links
 
Night Club at Oz Movies

1952 films
Australian musical drama films
1952 musical films
Australian black-and-white films